Ahiohill is a small village in County Cork, Ireland. The historical spelling for the area, Aghyohil, is reflected in the names of two local townlands, Aghyohil Beg and Aghyohil More. The village lies between the towns of Bandon,  Clonakilty and Ballineen/Enniskean. Ahiohill has one pub, "The Four Winds", and is home to Oliver Plunkett's GAA.

See also
 List of towns and villages in Ireland

References

Towns and villages in County Cork